Tyuleny Island (Ostrov Tyuleniy) is a small island in the Sea of Okhotsk, east of Russia's Sakhalin Island, in Northeast Asia.  It is also called Kaihyo Island .

Geography
The island is administrated by Sakhalin Oblast, in the Russian Far East District of the Russian Federation.  It was within the Karafuto Prefecture of Imperial Japan from 1905 to 1945.

Tyuleny Island is located off the eastern side of the Gulf of Patience,  to the south of Cape Patience (Mys Terpeniya), off the coast of the southern end of the Terpeniya Peninsula of eastern Sakhalin Island.

History

Fur seals were hunted on the island between 1854 and 1897. Over 100,000 were caught, with over half being taken illegally by foreign vessels. This led to the seizure of several schooners by Russian men-of-war in 1884 and 1891, including the arrest of a party of seventeen men left by a British vessel in 1895.

Fauna

There are many seals on Tyuleny's shores and in its surrounding waters, hence its name which means "seal" in the Russian language. It was formerly called "Robben Island," from the Dutch name for seal.

In the spring and summer seabirds nest on the island, including crested, parakeet and rhinoceros auklet, common and thick-billed murre, black-legged kittiwake, ancient murrelet, and tufted puffin.

The "Tyuleny Virus", a group B arbovirus, was recovered in 1969 on Tyuleny Island from ticks on birds.

References

External links

 Aina.ucalgary.ca: Seabird populations 
 Birdlife.org: Seabird population
 Sakhalin Oblast

Islands of the Sea of Okhotsk
Islands of Sakhalin Oblast
Karafuto
Seabird colonies